George Sidney Sitts (October 29, 1913 – April 8, 1947) was a convicted murderer who was executed by South Dakota for killing state Division of Criminal Investigation special agent Tom Matthews, who was attempting to arrest Sitts on a fugitive warrant from Minnesota.

Sitts was the only person to die in South Dakota's electric chair, and it would be over 60 years until the next time South Dakota would carry out an execution — Elijah Page via lethal injection on July 11, 2007.

Sitts, who escaped from prison while serving a life sentence for murder, also shot and killed Butte County Sheriff Dave Malcolm near Spearfish, on January 24, 1946. Sitts had pleaded guilty to second degree murder in Minnesota for the December 12, 1945, slaying of Erik Johansson, a liquor store clerk, during a botched robbery.

After spending three weeks sawing on the bars of his cell in the Minneapolis city jail, Sitts and three other men broke out the day before Sitts was scheduled to be transferred to a state prison.

After the slayings of Matthews and Malcolm, Sitts fled to Wyoming, where he was arrested on February 5, 1946, and returned to South Dakota. Sitts was tried first for the murder of Matthews and after his conviction and death sentence in March 1946, the state opted not to try him for Malcolm's murder.

South Dakota introduced the electric chair as the manner of execution in 1939 and Sitts was the fourth man sentenced to die in the chair. The three previous sentences, however, were commuted to life in prison.

Sitts's final words were a wry joke to the 41 official witnesses.  "This is the first time authorities helped me escape prison," he said right before the four shocks surged through his body at 12:15 a.m.

Special Agent Matthews name is inscribed on Panel 34 of the National Law Enforcement Officers Memorial located on Judiciary Square, Washington, D.C. Sheriff Malcolm's name is inscribed on Panel 53.

See also
 Capital punishment in South Dakota
 Capital punishment in the United States
 List of people executed in South Dakota

Resources
"Testimony Completed in Sitts Murder Trial," Associated Press, March 20, 1946.
"Chair Closes Criminal Career," Associated Press, April 8, 1947.
"Prisoner Faces Murder Charge," United Press, February 7, 1946.

References

External links
 National Law Enforcement Memorial 
 List of executions in South Dakota
 About South Dakota's electric chair

1913 births
1947 deaths
Executed people from Minnesota
20th-century executions by South Dakota
People executed by South Dakota by electric chair
20th-century executions of American people
People convicted of murder by South Dakota
American people executed for murdering police officers
People convicted of murder by Minnesota